

Events

Pre-1600
 314 – Pope Sylvester I is consecrated, as successor to the late Pope Miltiades.
1208 – The Battle of Lena takes place between King Sverker II of Sweden and his rival, Prince Eric, whose victory puts him on the throne as King Eric X of Sweden.
1504 – The Treaty of Lyon ends the Italian War, confirming French domination of northern Italy, while Spain receives the Kingdom of Naples.
1578 – Eighty Years' War and Anglo-Spanish War: The Battle of Gembloux is a victory for Spanish forces led by Don John of Austria over a rebel army of Dutch, Flemish, English, Scottish, German, French and Walloons.

1601–1900
1606 – Gunpowder Plot: Four of the conspirators, including Guy Fawkes, are executed for treason by hanging, drawing and quartering, for plotting against Parliament and King James.
1609 –  Wisselbank of Amsterdam established 
1747 – The first venereal diseases clinic opens at London Lock Hospital.
1814 – Gervasio Antonio de Posadas becomes Supreme Director of the United Provinces of the Río de la Plata (present-day Argentina).
1846 – After the Milwaukee Bridge War, the United States towns of Juneautown and Kilbourntown unify to create the City of Milwaukee.
1848 – John C. Frémont is court-martialed for mutiny and disobeying orders.
1862 – Alvan Graham Clark discovers the white dwarf star Sirius B, a companion of Sirius, through an  telescope now located at Northwestern University.
1865 – American Civil War: The United States Congress passes the Thirteenth Amendment to the United States Constitution, abolishing slavery, and submits it to the states for ratification.
  1865   – American Civil War: Confederate General Robert E. Lee becomes general-in-chief of all Confederate armies.
1891 – History of Portugal: The first attempt at a Portuguese republican revolution breaks out in the northern city of Porto.
1900 – Datu Muhammad Salleh is killed in Kampung Teboh, Tambunan, ending the Mat Salleh Rebellion.

1901–present
1901 – Anton Chekhov's Three Sisters premieres at Moscow Art Theatre in Russia. 
1915 – World War I: Germany is the first to make large-scale use of poison gas in warfare in the Battle of Bolimów against Russia.
1917 – World War I: Kaiser Wilhelm II orders the resumption of unrestricted submarine warfare.
1918 – A series of accidental collisions on a misty Scottish night leads to the loss of two Royal Navy submarines with over a hundred lives, and damage to another five British warships.
  1918   – Finnish Civil War: The Suinula massacre, which changes the nature of the war in a more hostile direction, takes place in Kangasala.
1919 – The Battle of George Square takes place in Glasgow, Scotland, during a campaign for shorter working hours.
1928 – Leon Trotsky is exiled to Alma-Ata.
1942 – World War II: Allied forces are defeated by the Japanese at the Battle of Malaya and retreat to Singapore.
1943 – World War II: German field marshal Friedrich Paulus surrenders to the Soviets at Stalingrad, followed two days later by the remainder of his Sixth Army, ending one of the war's fiercest battles.
1944 – World War II: American forces land on Kwajalein Atoll and other islands in the Japanese-held Marshall Islands.
  1944   – World War II: During the Anzio campaign, the 1st Ranger Battalion (Darby's Rangers) is destroyed behind enemy lines in a heavily outnumbered encounter at Battle of Cisterna, Italy.
1945 – US Army private Eddie Slovik is executed for desertion, the first such execution of an American soldier since the Civil War.
  1945   – World War II: About 3,000 inmates from the Stutthof concentration camp are forcibly marched into the Baltic Sea at Palmnicken (now Yantarny, Russia) and executed.
  1945   – World War II: The end of fighting in the Battle of Hill 170 during the Burma Campaign, in which the British 3 Commando Brigade repulsed a Japanese counterattack on their positions and precipitated a general retirement from the Arakan Peninsula.
1946 – Cold War: Yugoslavia's new constitution, modeling that of the Soviet Union, establishes six constituent republics (Bosnia and Herzegovina, Croatia, Macedonia, Montenegro, Serbia and Slovenia).
 1946 – The Democratic Republic of Vietnam introduces the đồng to replace the French Indochinese piastre at par.
1949 – These Are My Children, the first television daytime soap opera, is broadcast by the NBC station in Chicago.
1950 – President Truman orders the development of thermonuclear weapons.
1951 – United Nations Security Council Resolution 90 relating to the Korean War is adopted.
1953 – A North Sea flood causes over 1,800 deaths in the Netherlands and over 300 in the United Kingdom.
1957 – Eight people (five total crew from two aircraft and three on the ground) in Pacoima, California are killed following the mid-air collision between a Douglas DC-7 airliner and a Northrop F-89 Scorpion fighter jet.
1958 – Cold War: Space Race: The first successful American satellite detects the Van Allen radiation belt.
1961 – Project Mercury: Mercury-Redstone 2: The chimpanzee Ham travels into outer space.
1966 – The Soviet Union launches the unmanned Luna 9 spacecraft as part of the Luna program.
1968 – Vietnam War: Viet Cong guerrillas attack the United States embassy in Saigon, and other attacks, in the early morning hours, later grouped together as the Tet Offensive.
  1968   – Nauru gains independence from Australia.
1971 – Apollo program: Apollo 14: Astronauts Alan Shepard, Stuart Roosa, and Edgar Mitchell, aboard a Saturn V, lift off for a mission to the Fra Mauro Highlands on the Moon.
  1971   – The Winter Soldier Investigation, organized by the Vietnam Veterans Against the War to publicize war crimes and atrocities by Americans and allies in Vietnam, begins in Detroit.
1978 – The Crown of St. Stephen (also known as the Holy Crown of Hungary) goes on public display after being returned to Hungary from the United States, where it was held after World War II.
1988 – Doug Williams becomes the first African-American quarterback to play in a Super Bowl and leads the Washington Redskins to victory in Super Bowl XXII.
1996 – An explosives-filled truck rams into the gates of the Central Bank of Sri Lanka in Colombo, killing at least 86 people and injuring 1,400.
2000 – Alaska Airlines Flight 261 crash: An MD-83, experiencing horizontal stabilizer problems, crashes in the Pacific Ocean off the coast of Point Mugu, California, killing all 88 aboard.
2001 – In the Netherlands, a Scottish court convicts Libyan Abdelbaset al-Megrahi and acquits another Libyan citizen for their part in the bombing of Pan Am Flight 103 over Lockerbie, Scotland in 1988.
  2001   – Two Japan Airlines planes nearly collide over Suruga Bay in Japan.
2009 – In Kenya, at least 113 people are killed and over 200 injured following an oil spillage ignition in Molo, days after a massive fire at a Nakumatt supermarket in Nairobi killed at least 25 people.
2018 – Both a blue moon and a total lunar eclipse occur.
2019 – Abdullah of Pahang is sworn in as the 16th Yang di-Pertuan Agong of Malaysia.
2020 – The United Kingdom's membership within the European Union ceases in accordance with Article 50, after 47 years of being a member state.
2022 – Sue Gray, a senior civil servant in the United Kingdom, publishes an initial version of her report on the Downing Street Partygate controversy.
 2023 – The last Boeing 747, the first wide-body airliner, is delivered.

Births

Pre-1600
1512 – Henry, King of Portugal (d. 1580)
1543 – Tokugawa Ieyasu, Japanese shōgun (d. 1616)
1583 – Peter Bulkley, English and later American Puritan (d. 1659)
1597 – John Francis Regis, French priest and saint (d. 1640)

1601–1900
1607 – James Stanley, 7th Earl of Derby (d. 1651)
1624 – Arnold Geulincx, Flemish philosopher and academic (d. 1669)
1673 – Louis de Montfort, French priest and saint (d. 1716)
1686 – Hans Egede, Norwegian missionary and explorer (d. 1758)
1752 – Gouverneur Morris, American lawyer, politician, and diplomat, United States Ambassador to France (d. 1816)
1759 – François Devienne, French flute player and composer (d. 1803) 
1769 – André-Jacques Garnerin, French balloonist and the inventor of the frameless parachute (d. 1823)
1785 – Magdalena Dobromila Rettigová, Czech cook book author (d. 1845)
1797 – Franz Schubert, Austrian pianist and composer (d. 1828)
1799 – Rodolphe Töpffer, Swiss teacher, author, painter, cartoonist, and caricaturist (d. 1846)
1820 – William B. Washburn, American politician, 28th Governor of Massachusetts (d. 1887)
1835 – Lunalilo of Hawaii (d. 1874)
1854 – David Emmanuel, Romanian mathematician and academic (d. 1941)
1865 – Henri Desgrange, French cyclist and journalist (d. 1940)
  1865   – Shastriji Maharaj, Indian spiritual leader, founded BAPS (d. 1951)
1868 – Theodore William Richards, American chemist and academic, Nobel Prize laureate (d. 1928)
1872 – Zane Grey, American author (d. 1939)
1881 – Irving Langmuir, American chemist and physicist, Nobel Prize laureate (d. 1957)
1884 – Theodor Heuss, German journalist and politician, 1st President of the Federal Republic of Germany (d. 1963)
  1884   – Mammad Amin Rasulzade, Azerbaijani scholar and politician, 1st President of The Democratic Republic of Azerbaijan (d. 1955)
1889 – Frank Foster, English cricketer (d. 1958)
1892 – Eddie Cantor, American singer-songwriter, actor, and dancer (d. 1964)
1894 – Isham Jones, American saxophonist, composer, and bandleader (d. 1956)
1896 – Sofya Yanovskaya, Russian mathematician and historian (d. 1966)
1900 – Betty Parsons, American artist, art dealer and collector (d. 1982)

1901–present
1902 – Nat Bailey, Canadian businessman, founded White Spot (d. 1978)
  1902   – Tallulah Bankhead, American actress (d. 1968)
  1902   – Alva Myrdal, Swedish sociologist and politician, Nobel Prize laureate (d. 1986)
  1902   – Julian Steward, American anthropologist (d. 1972)
1905 – John O'Hara, American author, playwright, and screenwriter (d. 1970)
1909 – Miron Grindea, Romanian-English journalist (d. 1995)
1913 – Don Hutson, American football player and coach (d. 1997)
1914 – Jersey Joe Walcott, American boxer and police officer (d. 1994)
1915 – Bobby Hackett, American trumpet player and cornet player (d. 1976)
  1915   – Alan Lomax, American historian, author, and scholar (d. 2002)
  1915   – Thomas Merton, American monk and author (d. 1968)
  1915   – Garry Moore, American comedian and game show host (d. 1993)
1916 – Frank Parker, American tennis player (d. 1997)
1917 – Fred Bassetti, American architect and academic, founded Bassetti Architects (d. 2013)
1919 – Jackie Robinson, American baseball player and sportscaster (d. 1972)
1920 – Stewart Udall, American lawyer and politician, 37th United States Secretary of the Interior (d. 2010)
  1920   – Bert Williams, English footballer (d. 2014)
1921 – John Agar, American actor (d. 2002)
  1921   – Carol Channing, American actress, singer, and dancer (d. 2019)
  1921   – E. Fay Jones, American architect, designed the Thorncrown Chapel (d. 2004)
  1921   – Mario Lanza, American tenor and actor (d. 1959)
1922 – Joanne Dru, American actress (d. 1996)
1923 – Norman Mailer, American journalist and author (d. 2007)
1925 – Benjamin Hooks, American minister, lawyer, and activist (d. 2010)
1926 – Tom Alston, American baseball player (d. 1993)
  1926   – Chuck Willis, American singer-songwriter (d. 1958)
1927 – Norm Prescott, American animator, producer, and composer, co-founded Filmation Studios (d. 2005)
1928 – Irma Wyman, American computer scientist and engineer (d. 2015)
1929 – Rudolf Mössbauer, German physicist and academic, Nobel Prize laureate (d. 2011)
  1929   – Jean Simmons, English-American actress (d. 2010)
1930 – Joakim Bonnier, Swedish race car driver (d. 1972)
  1930   – Al De Lory, American composer, conductor, and producer (d. 2012)
1931 – Ernie Banks, American baseball player and coach (d. 2015)
  1931   – Christopher Chataway, English runner, journalist, and politician (d. 2014)
1932 – Miron Babiak, Polish sea captain (d. 2013)
1933 – Camille Henry, Canadian ice hockey player and coach (d. 1997)
  1933   – Morton Mower, American cardiologist and inventor (d. 2022)
1934 – Ernesto Brambilla, Italian motorcycle racer and race car driver (d. 2020)
  1934   – Gene DeWeese, American author (d. 2012)
  1934   – James Franciscus, American actor and producer (d. 1991)
  1934   – Bob Turner, Canadian ice hockey player and coach (d. 2005)
1935 – Kenzaburō Ōe, Japanese author and academic, Nobel Prize laureate (d. 2023)
1936 – Can Bartu, Turkish former basketball and football player (d. 2019)
1937 – Regimantas Adomaitis, Lithuanian actor (d. 2022)
  1937   – Andrée Boucher, Canadian educator and politician, 39th Mayor of Quebec City (d. 2007)
  1937   – Philip Glass, American composer
  1937   – Suzanne Pleshette, American actress (d. 2008)
1938 – Beatrix of the Netherlands
  1938   – Lynn Carlin, American actress
  1938   – James G. Watt, American lawyer and politician, 43rd United States Secretary of the Interior
1940 – Kitch Christie, South African rugby player and coach (d. 1998)
  1940   – Stuart Margolin, American actor and director (d. 2022)
1941 – Dick Gephardt, American lawyer and politician
  1941   – Gerald McDermott, American author and illustrator (d. 2012)
  1941   – Jessica Walter, American actress (d. 2021)
1942 – Daniela Bianchi, Italian actress
  1942   – Derek Jarman, English director, stage designer, and author (d. 1994)
1944 – John Inverarity, Australian cricketer and coach
1945 – Rynn Berry, American historian and author (d. 2014)
  1945   – Brenda Hale, Baroness Hale of Richmond, English lawyer, judge, and academic
  1945   – Joseph Kosuth, American sculptor and theorist
1946 – Terry Kath, American guitarist and singer-songwriter (d. 1978)
  1946   – Medin Zhega, Albanian footballer and manager (d. 2012)
1947 – Jonathan Banks, American actor
  1947   – Matt Minglewood, Canadian singer-songwriter and guitarist
  1947   – Nolan Ryan, American baseball player
  1947   – Glynn Turman, American actor
1948 – Volkmar Groß, German footballer (d. 2014)
  1948   – Muneo Suzuki, Japanese politician
1949 – Johan Derksen, Dutch footballer and journalist
  1949   – Norris Church Mailer, American model and educator (d. 2010)
  1949   – Ken Wilber, American sociologist, philosopher, and author
1950 – Denise Fleming, American author and illustrator
  1950   – Alexander Korzhakov, Russian general and bodyguard
  1950   – Janice Rebibo, American-Israeli author and poet (d. 2015)
1951 – Harry Wayne Casey, American singer-songwriter, pianist, and producer 
1954 – Faoud Bacchus, Guyanese cricketer
  1954   – Adrian Vandenberg, Dutch guitarist and songwriter
1955 – Virginia Ruzici, Romanian tennis player and manager
1956 – Guido van Rossum, Dutch programmer, creator of the Python programming language
  1956   – John Lydon, English singer-songwriter 
1957 – Shirley Babashoff, American swimmer
1958 – Armin Reichel, German footballer and manager
1959 – Anthony LaPaglia, Australian actor and producer
  1959   – Kelly Lynch, American model and actress
1960 – Akbar Ganji, Iranian journalist and author
  1960   – Grant Morrison, Scottish author and screenwriter
  1960   – Željko Šturanović, Montenegrin politician, 31st Prime Minister of Montenegro (d. 2014)
1961 – Elizabeth Barker, Baroness Barker, English politician
  1961   – Fatou Bensouda, Gambian lawyer and judge
  1961   – Lloyd Cole, English singer-songwriter and guitarist
1963 – Craig Coleman, Australian rugby league player and coach
  1963   – Gwen Graham, American lawyer and politician
1964 – Martha MacCallum, American journalist
  1964   – Dawn Prince-Hughes, American scientist
1965 – Giorgos Gasparis, Greek basketball player and coach
  1965   – Ofra Harnoy, Israeli-Canadian cellist
  1965   – Peter Sagal, American author and radio host
1966 – Umar Alisha, Indian journalist and philanthropist
  1966   – Thant Myint-U, Myanmar historian, diplomat, conservationist, and former presidential advisor.
  1966   – Dexter Fletcher, English actor and director
1967 – Fat Mike, American singer-songwriter, bass player, and producer 
1968 – John Collins, Scottish footballer and manager
  1968   – Matt King, English actor, producer, and screenwriter
  1968   – Ulrica Messing, Swedish politician, 2nd Swedish Minister for Infrastructure
  1968   – Patrick Stevens, Belgian sprinter
1969 – Dov Charney, Canadian-American fashion designer and businessman, founded American Apparel
  1969   – Daniel Moder, American cinematographer
1970 – Minnie Driver, English singer-songwriter and actress
  1970   – Danny Michel, Canadian singer-songwriter and producer
1971 – Patricia Velásquez, Venezuelan model and actress
1973 – Portia de Rossi, Australian-American actress
1974 – Othella Harrington, American basketball player and coach
  1974   – Ariel Pestano, Cuban baseball player
1975 – Preity Zinta, Indian actress, producer, and television host
1976 – Traianos Dellas, Greek footballer and manager
  1976   – Buddy Rice, American race car driver
1977 – Bobby Moynihan, American actor and comedian
  1977   – Kerry Washington, American actress
1978 – Fabián Caballero, Argentinian footballer and manager
1979 – Daniel Tammet, English author and educator
1980 – James Adomian, American comedian, actor, and screenwriter 
  1980   – Gary Doherty, Irish footballer
  1980   – Shim Yi-young, South Korean actress
1981 – Julio Arca, Argentinian footballer
  1981   – Mark Cameron, Australian cricketer
  1981   – Gemma Collins, English media personality and businesswoman
  1981   – Justin Timberlake, American singer-songwriter, dancer, and actor
1982 – Maret Ani, Estonian tennis player 
  1982   – Allan McGregor, Scottish international footballer
  1982   – Jānis Sprukts, Latvian ice hockey player
1983 – Fabio Quagliarella, Italian footballer
1984 – Vernon Davis, American football player
  1984   – Josh Johnson, Canadian-American baseball player
  1984   – Jeremy Wariner, American runner
  1984   – Alessandro Zanni, Italian rugby player
1985 – Adam Federici, Australian footballer
  1985   – Mario Williams, American football player
1986 – Walter Dix, American sprinter
  1986   – Megan Ellison, American film producer, founded Annapurna Pictures
  1986   – George Elokobi, Cameroonian footballer
  1986   – Yves Ma-Kalambay, Belgian footballer
  1986   – Pauline Parmentier, French tennis player
1987 – Marcus Mumford, American-English singer-songwriter 
1988 – Brett Pitman, English footballer
  1988   – Taijo Teniste, Estonian footballer
1990 – Jacopo Fortunato, Italian footballer
  1990   – Jacob Markström, Swedish ice hockey player
  1990   – Kota Yabu, Japanese idol, singer-songwriter, model, actor
  1990   – Cro, German rapper
1993 – Qiu Bo, China Diver 
1994 – Kenneth Zohore, Danish footballer
1996 – Nikita Dragun, American Youtuber
2006 – Sára Bejlek, Czech tennis player

Deaths

Pre-1600
 632 – Máedóc of Ferns, Irish bishop and saint (b. 550)
 876 – Hemma of Altdorf, Frankish queen
 985 – Ryōgen, Japanese monk and abbot (b. 912)
1030 – William V, duke of Aquitaine (b. 969)
1216 – Theodore II, patriarch of Constantinople
1398 – Sukō, emperor of Japan (b. 1334)
1418 – Mircea I, prince of Wallachia (b. 1355)
1435 – Xuande, emperor of China (b. 1398)
1561 – Bairam Khan, Mughalan general (b. 1501)
  1561   – Menno Simons, Dutch minister and theologian (b. 1496)
1580 – Henry, king of Portugal (b. 1512)

1601–1900
1606 – Guy Fawkes, English conspirator, leader of the Gunpowder Plot (b. 1570)
  1606   – Ambrose Rookwood, English Gunpowder Plot conspirator (b. 1578)
  1606   – Thomas Wintour, English Gunpowder Plot conspirator (b. 1571)
1615 – Claudio Acquaviva, Italian priest, 5th Superior General of the Society of Jesus (b. 1543)
1632 – Jost Bürgi, Swiss clockmaker and mathematician (b. 1552)
1665 – Johannes Clauberg, German philosopher and theologian (b. 1622)
1686 – Jean Mairet, French playwright (b. 1604)
1720 – Thomas Grey, 2nd Earl of Stamford, English politician, Chancellor of the Duchy of Lancaster (b. 1654)
1729 – Jacob Roggeveen, Dutch explorer (b. 1659)
1736 – Filippo Juvarra, Italian architect and set designer, designed the Basilica of Superga (b. 1678)
1790 – Thomas Lewis, Irish-born American lawyer and surveyor (b. 1718)
1794 – Mariot Arbuthnot, English admiral and politician, 12th Lieutenant Governor of Nova Scotia (b. 1711)
1811 – Manuel Alberti, Argentinian priest and journalist (b. 1763)
1815 – José Félix Ribas, Venezuelan soldier (b. 1775)
1828 – Alexander Ypsilantis, Greek general (b. 1792)
1836 – John Cheyne, English physician and author (b. 1777)
1844 – Henri Gatien Bertrand, French general (b. 1773)
1856 – 11th Dalai Lama (b. 1838)
1870 – Cilibi Moise, Moldavian-Romanian journalist and author (b. 1812)
1888 – John Bosco, Italian priest and educator, founded the Salesian Society (b. 1815)
1892 – Charles Spurgeon, English pastor and author (b. 1834)
1900 – John Douglas, 9th Marquess of Queensberry, Scottish nobleman (b. 1844)

1901–present
1907 – Timothy Eaton, Canadian businessman, founded Eaton's (b. 1834)
1911 – Paul Singer, German politician (b. 1844)
1923 – Eligiusz Niewiadomski, Polish painter and critic (b. 1869)
1933 – John Galsworthy, English novelist and playwright, Nobel Prize laureate (b. 1867)
1942 – Henry Larkin, American baseball player and manager (b. 1860)
1944 – Jean Giraudoux, French author and playwright (b. 1882)
1954 – Edwin Howard Armstrong, American engineer, invented FM radio (b. 1890)
  1954   – Vivian Woodward, English captain and footballer (b. 1879)
1955 – John Mott, American activist, Nobel Prize laureate (b. 1865)
1956 – A. A. Milne, English author, poet, and playwright, created Winnie-the-Pooh (b. 1882)
1958 – Karl Selter, Estonian politician, 14th Estonian Minister of Foreign Affairs (b. 1898)
1960 – Auguste Herbin, French painter (b. 1882) 
1961 – Krishna Singh, Indian politician, 1st Chief Minister of Bihar (b. 1887)
1966 – Arthur Percival, English general (b. 1887)
1967 – Eddie Tolan, American sprinter and educator (b. 1908)
1969 – Meher Baba, Indian spiritual master (b. 1894)
1971 – Viktor Zhirmunsky, Russian historian and linguist (b. 1891)
1973 – Ragnar Frisch, Norwegian economist and academic, Nobel Prize laureate (b. 1895)
1974 – Samuel Goldwyn, Polish-American film producer, co-founded Goldwyn Pictures (b. 1882)
1976 – Ernesto Miranda, American criminal (b. 1941)
  1976   – Evert Taube, Swedish author and composer (b. 1890)
1985 – Reginald Baker, English-Australian film producer (b. 1896)
  1985   – Tatsuzō Ishikawa, Japanese author (b. 1905)
1987 – Yves Allégret, French director and screenwriter (b. 1907)
1989 – William Stephenson, Canadian captain and spy (b. 1896)
1990 – Eveline Du Bois-Reymond Marcus, German zoologist and academic (b. 1901)
  1990   – Rashad Khalifa, Egyptian-American biochemist and academic (b. 1935)
1995 – George Abbott, American actor, director, and producer (b. 1887)
1997 – John Joseph Scanlan, Irish-American bishop (b. 1930)
1999 – Giant Baba, Japanese wrestler and trainer, co-founded All Japan Pro Wrestling (b. 1938)
  1999   – Norm Zauchin, American baseball player (b. 1929)
2000 – Gil Kane, Latvian-American author and illustrator (b. 1926)
2001 – Gordon R. Dickson, Canadian-American author (b. 1923)
2002 – Gabby Gabreski, American colonel and pilot (b. 1919)
2004 – Eleanor Holm, American swimmer and actress (b. 1913)
  2004   – Suraiya, Indian actress and playback singer (b. 1929)
2006 – Moira Shearer, Scottish actress and ballerina (b. 1926)
2007 – Molly Ivins, American journalist and author (b. 1944)
  2007   – Adelaide Tambo, South African activist and politician (b. 1929)
2008 – František Čapek, Czechoslovakian canoeist (b. 1914)
2011 – Bartolomeu Anania, Romanian bishop and poet (b. 1921)
  2011   – Mark Ryan, English guitarist and playwright (b. 1959)
2012 – Mani Ram Bagri, Indian lawyer and politician (b. 1920)
  2012   – Anthony Bevilacqua, American cardinal (b. 1923)
  2012   – Tristram Potter Coffin, American author, scholar, and academic (b. 1922)
  2012   – Dorothea Tanning, American painter and sculptor (b. 1910)
2013 – Rubén Bonifaz Nuño, Mexican poet and scholar (b. 1923)
  2013   – Hassan Habibi, Iranian lawyer and politician, 1st Vice President of Iran (b. 1937)
2014 – Francis M. Fesmire, American cardiologist and physician (b. 1959)
  2014   – Anna Gordy Gaye, American songwriter and producer, co-founded Anna Records (b. 1922)
  2014   – Abdirizak Haji Hussein, Somalian politician, 4th Prime Minister of Somalia (b. 1924)
  2014   – Miklós Jancsó, Hungarian director and screenwriter (b. 1921)
  2014   – Joseph Willcox Jenkins, American composer, conductor, and educator (b. 1928)
  2014   – Christopher Jones, American actor (b. 1941)
2015 – Vic Howe, Canadian ice hockey player (b. 1929)
  2015   – Udo Lattek, German footballer, coach, and journalist (b. 1935)
  2015   – Lizabeth Scott, American actress (b. 1922)
  2015   – Richard von Weizsäcker, German captain and politician, 6th President of Germany (b. 1920)
2016 – Terry Wogan, Irish radio and television host (b. 1938)
2017 – Rob Stewart, Canadian filmmaker (b. 1979)
2018 – Rasual Butler, American professional basketball player (b. 1979)
  2018   – Leah LaBelle, American singer (b. 1986)

Holidays and observances
Christian feast day:
Domitius (Domice) of Amiens
Francis Xavier Bianchi
Geminianus
John Bosco
Julius of Novara
Blessed Ludovica
Máedóc (Mogue, Aiden)
Marcella
Samuel Shoemaker (Episcopal Church (USA))
Tysul
Ulphia
Wilgils
January 31 (Eastern Orthodox liturgics)
Amartithi (Meherabad, India, followers of Meher Baba)
Independence Day (Nauru), celebrates independence from Australia in 1968.
Street Children's Day (Austria)

References

External links

 BBC: On This Day
 
 Historical Events on January 31

Days of the year
January